Frederick N. Allen (August 10, 1914 – November 11, 2001) was an American politician from Maine. Allen, a Republican from Portland, served two terms in the Maine House of Representatives (1944-1948) and twice in the Maine Senate (1948-1952).

He served as the national president of the National Association of Regulatory Utility Commissioners, an association of state commissioners of public utilities. He was appointed by Governor Frederick G. Payne to the Maine Public Utilities Commission, which regulates the various utilities of the state of Maine.

Allen managed Burton M. Cross's successful first campaign for governor in 1952. He was also an early supporter of U.S. Senator Margaret Chase Smith. In 2002, he supported Democrat Chellie Pingree for U.S. Senate.

Personal life
Allen was the son of Neal W. Allen, who four times served as Mayor of Portland and Margaret Stevens Allen, who was the daughter of architect John Calvin Stevens. His nephew, Tom Allen, served as Mayor of Portland before serving 6 terms in the U.S. House of Representatives.

He was born in Portland in 1914 and graduated from Portland Public Schools before attending Boston University.

Allen died in Gorham on November 11, 2001, at the age of 87.

References

1914 births
2001 deaths
Politicians from Portland, Maine
Republican Party members of the Maine House of Representatives
Republican Party Maine state senators
Boston University alumni
20th-century American politicians